Blair is a city in and the county seat of Washington County, Nebraska, United States.  The population was 7,990 at the 2010 census.

History
Blair was platted in 1869 when the Sioux City and Pacific Railroad was extended to that point. It was named for railroad magnate John Insley Blair, who was credited with bringing the railroad to town. Blair was incorporated as a city in 1872. Within its first year, Blair was designated county seat.

In March 1869, a small child playing on a railroad turntable in town was injured on the turntable. The father sued the railway for damages, leading all the way up to the Supreme Court of the United States in the 1873 case Sioux City & Pacific Railroad Co. v. Stout.

In 1874, during the Panic of 1873, a grasshopper storm enveloped the region. Many Nebraskans were faced with starvation. An organization, the Nebraska Relief and Aid Society was formed in order to help affected persons. A law was passed by congress awarding $100,000 relief, and many Blair citizens were awarded money. Both the newspapers and the railroads in the region helped transport supplies free of charge. Both the Nebraska State Guard and the United States Army helped distribute food and clothing.

In September 1882, construction of the Chicago and Northwestern Bridge across the Missouri River began. The bridge was authorized by an Act of Congress on June 27, 1882. The total cost of the bridge was $1.13 Million (nearly $30 Million in 2019). By November 1883, the bridge was finally open for rail traffic.

In 1916, Blair was awarded a $10,000 grant to build a Carnegie Library. Unfortunately, an electrical fire occurred on the night of July 23, 1973, and the historic library was deemed a total loss.

Geography
Blair is located at  (41.545562, -96.134383).

Blair is located in the Loess Hills, surrounded on all sides by rolling hills and the Missouri river valley.

Demographics

Blair is a part of the Omaha-Council Bluffs Metropolitan Statistical Area.

2010 census
At the 2010 census there were 7,990 people, 3,110 households, and 2,005 families living in the city. The racial makeup of the city was 96.4% White, 0.8% African American, 0.3% Native American, 0.3% Asian, 0.1% Pacific Islander, 1.0% from other races, and 1.1% from two or more races. Hispanic or Latino of any race were 2.9%.

Of the 3,110 households 33.3% had children under the age of 18 living with them, 50.5% were married couples living together, 10.6% had a female householder with no husband present, 3.3% had a male householder with no wife present, and 35.5% were non-families. 30.3% of households were one person and 13.4% were one person aged 65 or older. The average household size was 2.40 and the average family size was 3.01.

The median age was 36 years. 24.9% of residents were under the age of 18; 11.7% were between the ages of 18 and 24; 23.9% were from 25 to 44; 24.3% were from 45 to 64; and 15.3% were 65 or older. The gender makeup of the city was 47.9% male and 52.1% female.

2000 census
At the 2000 census, there were 7,512 people, 2,871 households, and 1,891 families living in the city. The population density was 1,617.3 people per square mile (625.1/km). There were 3,033 housing units at an average density of 653.0 per square mile (252.4/km). The racial makeup of the city was 97.43% White, 0.44% African American, 0.29% Native American, 0.33% Asian, 0.27% Pacific Islander, 0.33% from other races, and 0.91% from two or more races. Hispanic or Latino of any race were 1.34% of the population.

Of the 2,871 households 33.9% had children under the age of 18 living with them, 52.8% were married couples living together, 10.1% had a female householder with no husband present, and 34.1% were non-families. 29.1% of households were one person and 14.4% were one person aged 65 or older. The average household size was 2.43 and the average family size was 3.02.

The age distribution was 24.9% under the age of 18, 13.8% from 18 to 24, 25.6% from 25 to 44, 20.4% from 45 to 64, and 15.4% 65 or older. The median age was 35 years. For every 100 females, there were 90.9 males. For every 100 females age 18 and over, there were 88.2 males.

The median household income was $41,214, and the median family income  was $52,114. Males had a median income of $36,839 versus $25,452 for females. The per capita income for the city was $19,240. About 6.2% of families and 8.4% of the population were below the poverty line, including 11.4% of those under age 18 and 10.5% of those age 65 or over.

Media
Blair is served by the local weekly newspaper Pilot-Tribune & Enterprise.
Blair is also served by Walnut Radio Station 97.3 KOBM-FM and FM 94.7 KYTF-LP Blair Radio.

Points of interest
 Part of the Nebraska Statewide Arboretum collection
 From 1896 to 1954, Blair was home to Trinity Seminary, a school of the United Evangelical Lutheran Church
 Blair is located along the historic Lincoln Highway
 Tower of the Four Winds at Black Elk-Neihardt Park stands as a memorial to John G. Neihardt and Black Elk, the Lakota Sioux holy man

Education
It is a part of the Blair Community Schools which operates Blair High School.

Blair was home to the now defunct Dana College (1884 to 2010).

Notable people
 Kent Bellows - artist
 Clete Blakeman - professional football official
 Bob Cerv - baseball player
 Bill Danenhauer - professional wrestler
 Mike Hollingshead - photographer
 Megan Hunt - Nebraska State Senator, Legislative District 8
 Mick Mines - Nebraska state senator
 Otto Schmidt - US Navy Medal of Honor recipient
 Tom Seaton - baseball player
 Paul Simon - Democratic Congressman, Senator, and presidential candidate
 Rod Whitaker - novelist

See also
 Washington County Historical Association

References

External links
 Official site
 Local History site

Cities in Nebraska
Cities in Washington County, Nebraska
County seats in Nebraska
1869 establishments in Nebraska
Populated places established in 1869